Shin Sol-yi (Hangul: 신솔이; born July 14, 2004) is a South Korean artistic gymnast. She is the 2021 South Korean national champion. She finished eleventh in the all-around at the 2021 World Championships, the highest-ever placement for a South Korean female gymnast. On the junior level, Shin is the 2017 Asian Junior Championships vault silver medalist.

Personal life 
Shin was born on July 17, 2004, in Chungbuk, South Korea. As of 2021, she is a student at Chungbuk Physical Education High School.

Career

Junior

2017 
Shin competed at the 2017 Asian Junior Championships and won bronze with the Korean team. Individually, she finished seventh in the all-around and won silver on vault. She also competed in the uneven bars and floor exercise finals. Shin then competed at the 2017 Junior Japan International, where she placed 11th in the all-around and qualified to the uneven bars final, finishing eighth.

2018 
Shin again competed at the Asian Junior Championships and again won bronze with the Korean team. Individually, she qualified to the vault, uneven bars, and floor exercise finals, but did not medal. Shin won the middle school division of the Ministry of Culture, Sports and Tourism meet for a second consecutive year despite minor ankle and calf injuries.

2019 
Shin finished sixth at a Korean national team selection event and was named to the Korean team for the inaugural 2019 World Junior Championships alongside Hyun Jin-ju and Lee Da-yeong. She finished 38th in qualifications (29th after the two-per-country rule was applied) and did not advance to any finals.

Senior

2020 
Shin did not compete due to the COVID-19 pandemic in South Korea; it would have been her first senior international season.

2021 
Shin won the Korean national team selection meet at the end of April ahead of Eom Do-hyun and Yeo Seo-jeong. She won the South Korean Championships in early May with the highest score on every event except vault, where she had the second-highest score. Shin did not compete at the 2020 Summer Olympics due to South Korea having only qualified two nominative berths belonging to Yeo and Lee Yun-seo. She then competed at the Korean National Sports Festival where she won gold on vault and floor exercise and silver in the all-around, uneven bars, and balance beam, all behind Lee. Due to her results, Shin was named to the Korean delegation for the 2021 World Championships alongside Lee, Eom, and Lee Da-yeong.

At the World Championships, Shin qualified in 14th to the individual all-around final and was first reserve for the floor exercise final. In the all-around final, she improved to 11th overall, besting Park Ji-suk's 18th-place finish in 1987 for the highest-ever placement for a South Korean female gymnast in World Championships history.

Competitive history

References

External links 

 

2004 births
Living people
South Korean female artistic gymnasts
Sportspeople from North Chungcheong Province
21st-century South Korean women